Henry B. Lathrop (1808 - 1890) was a mason and mine superintendent who served in the Michigan Senate. He was a Whig.

References

1808 births
1890 deaths
Michigan state senators
Michigan Whigs